Svenska Supercupen 2014, Swedish Super Cup 2014, was the 8th Svenska Supercupen, an annual football match contested by the winners of the previous season's Allsvenskan and Svenska Cupen competitions.  The match was played at Malmö Stadion, Malmö, on 9 November 2014, and was played by the 2014 Allsvenskan champions Malmö FF and the 2013–14 Svenska Cupen champions IF Elfsborg. The match was IF Elfsborg's second in the competition and their first since 2007. It was Malmö FF's second successive appearance and third in total, it was also the first time that the competition was hosted at Malmö Stadion and the first time the competition was hosted at an alternative home venue. 

In Sweden the match was broadcast live on TV12. Martin Strömbergsson from Gävle was the referee for match, his first time officiating the competition. His older brother Markus had previously officiated three Svenska Supercupen matches. Malmö FF won the match on penalties 5–4 after the match had ended 2–2 after extra time. IF Elfsborg took the lead through Viktor Claesson in the first half, Malmö FF equalized Elfsborg's lead in the 89th minute of ordinary time. Malmö FF then took the lead through Emil Forsberg in the second half of extra time, only to have their lead equalized by Viktor Prodell on a penalty in the last minute of extra time. The match proceeded to penalties which Malmö FF won 5–4 after Elfsborg had missed their last two penalties. This was the first time Svenska Supercupen went to extra time and penalties in its eight-year history.

Background
IF Elfsborg qualified for Svenska Supercupen on 18 May 2014 when they won the 2014 Svenska Cupen Final against Helsingborgs IF 1–0. Elfsborg had one previous appearance in the competition, the inaugural edition of 2007 when they won the title after beating Helsingborgs IF 1–0 at Borås Arena. Malmö FF qualified for the competition of 5 October 2014 when they secured the 2014 Allsvenskan title in the 27th league round in the away fixture against AIK at Friends Arena with a 3–2 win. Malmö FF made their second successive appearance in the competition, being the current holders of the title after defeating IFK Göteborg in last year's competition. The match was Malmö FF's third appearance in total for Svenska Supercupen. Malmö FF had home advantage in the competition as league champions. Malmö FF chose to play the match at the clubs alternative home venue Malmö Stadion.

The two clubs met in league play during the season, Malmö FF defeated Elfsborg at Borås Arena 1–0 on 1 June 2014 and Elfsborg defeated Malmö FF at Swedbank Stadion 2–1 on 18 October 2014 in the 28th league round. The last time the two clubs faced each other in a domestic cup match was in the semi-finals for Svenska Cupen on 31 May 1984, a match which Malmö FF won 2–0. Malmö FF and Elfsborg had never met each other in a cup final prior to this match. Prior to the match both teams declared that, regardless of which team won the match, they would donate the entire prize-sum of 250,000 SEK to a trust fund in the name of Klas Ingesson, former manager of Elfsborg who died on 29 October 2014.

For Malmö FF two players from the starting line-up, goalkeeper Robin Olsen and defender Erik Johansson missed the match due to injuries sustained in Malmö FF's match in the UEFA Champions League against Atlético Madrid on 4 November 2014. Club captain Guillermo Molins was also missing from a long-term injury that made him miss the second half of the 2014 season. IF Elfsborg had forward Lasse Nilsson, defender Sebastian Holmén and midfielder Anton Andreasson missing due to injuries before the match and defender Jon Jönsson missing for an undisclosed reason.

Match facts

See also
2014 Allsvenskan
2013–14 Svenska Cupen

References

External links
 

Supercupen
2014
Malmö FF matches
IF Elfsborg matches
Sports competitions in Malmö
2010s in Malmö
Association football penalty shoot-outs